Andris Siksnis (born May 6, 1993) is a Latvian ice hockey player currently playing for the HK Rīga of the MHL.

Playing career
Siknsnis began his hockey career playing in minor and junior Latvian hockey leagues. In 2011/2012 season he joined HK Rīga Dinamo Rīga minor league affiliate.
At the beginning of 2013/14 season Siksnis was a healthy stretch for Dinamo Rīga. He made his KHL debut on September 22 on win against Vityaz.

International
Siksnis participated at the 2012 World Junior Ice Hockey Championships as a member of the Latvia men's national junior ice hockey team.

References

External links

1993 births
Living people
Latvian ice hockey forwards
HK Riga players
Dinamo Riga players